Usman Ullah Khan (29 September 1974 – 20 February 2020) was a Pakistani boxer. He competed at the 1996 Summer Olympics and the 2000 Summer Olympics.

References

External links
 

1974 births
2020 deaths
Pakistani male boxers
Olympic boxers of Pakistan
Boxers at the 1996 Summer Olympics
Boxers at the 2000 Summer Olympics
People from Faisalabad
Asian Games medalists in boxing
Boxers at the 1994 Asian Games
Medalists at the 1994 Asian Games
Asian Games silver medalists for Pakistan
Sportspeople from Faisalabad
Welterweight boxers
20th-century Pakistani people